Mark Canning  (born 15 December 1954) is a British former diplomat and was British Ambassador to Indonesia between August 2011 and 2014, before being succeeded by Moazzam Malik. He served concurrently as British Ambassador to the Association of South East Asian Nations (ASEAN) and to Timor Leste. He is a career member of the UK Foreign Service and has occupied a series of challenging and sensitive senior diplomatic appointments. Prior to his current position he served as Britain's Ambassador to Zimbabwe (2009–2011) and to Myanmar (Burma) (2006–2009). Prior to his three ambassadorial assignments, he served as a Deputy High Commissioner at the British High Commission in Kuala Lumpur, Malaysia.

Canning was educated at Downside School and University College London. He holds also a Masters in Business Administration. He joined the British Foreign and Commonwealth Office (FCO) in 1974 and has served in a wide variety of diplomatic roles, both at home and overseas. His appointments at the Foreign Office in London included significant exposure to counter-terrorism, security and other foreign policy issues. His overseas postings have had a strong focus on the emerging markets of the Asia Pacific and support to UK business, but he has also served in Africa, the US and Latin America. He is an experienced media operator, who has made frequent appearances in the broadcast and print media. As a noted expert on the politics and economics of the nations of South East Asia, Canning has also lectured at a range of academic and other institutions including the Royal College of Defence Studies.

Canning was appointed Companion of the Order of St Michael and St George (CMG) in The Queen's 2009 New Year Honours list. He is married with one daughter.

Since leaving the British Diplomatic Service in 2014 he has acted as an advisor to a range of companies active in Southeast Asia and elsewhere.

References

External links
CANNING, Mark, Who's Who 2014, A & C Black, 2014; online edn, Oxford University Press, Dec 2013
Mark Canning, gov.uk
Mark Canning the Ambassador to Myanmar
Mark Canning, BBC News

1954 births
Living people
People educated at Downside School
Alumni of University College London
Ambassadors of the United Kingdom to Myanmar
Ambassadors of the United Kingdom to Zimbabwe
Ambassadors of the United Kingdom to Indonesia
Companions of the Order of St Michael and St George